Siege of Cambrai may refer to:

 Siege of Cambrai (1339) during the Hundred Years' War
 Siege of Cambrai (1677) during the Franco-Dutch War
 Storm of Cambrai (1815) during the Waterloo campaign